Derek Leebaert is an American technology executive who writes books on history and politics, which evoke insights on leadership. He won the biennial 2020 Truman Book Award for Grand Improvisation, and he's a founder of the National Museum of the United States Army. Leebaert's latest book--Unlikely Heroes: Franklin Roosevelt, His Four Lieutenants, and the World They Made--was published in early 2023. Presidential historian Richard Norton Smith praises it as "having done the near impossible--craft[ing] a fresh and challenging portrait of the man and his inner circle. . . .A book to regard in the same breath as the classics of Sherwood, Schlesinger, and Burns."

Life 
Leebaert cofounded Linguateq (telecom billing software) which was sold to SONUS Networks, and currently works as a management consultant, focusing on the IT, healthcare, and defense sectors. He cofounded the Swiss advisory firm Management Alignment Partners (MAP AG) in 2005 and, from 2009-2018, he was a trustee of Providence Health System (part of Ascension Health). He remains involved in the national debate over access to quality healthcare.  

Leebaert's book on elite military operations, To Dare and To Conquer has been on various United States Special Operations Command reading lists.  It has been required reading in the Q Course at Ft. Bragg as well. To Dare and to Conquer was a Washington Post Book World "Nonfiction Best Book" of 2006, as was his subsequent book, Magic and Mayhem: The Delusions of American Foreign Policy from Korea to Afghanistan, for 2010.   His latest book, Grand Improvisation (2018) was a New York Times "Best Book," and reviews are found in the Wall Street Journal, the New York Review of Books, the Times (London), et al. Leebaert also co-authored the MIT Press trilogy on the IT revolution, including The Future of the Electronic Marketplace and The Future of Software.   
.

He holds a B.A. from Vanderbilt (history/economics), an M.A. from Columbia University (international affairs), and a D.Phil. in political economy from Oxford University (1983). He was a postdoctoral research fellow at Harvard's Center for Science and International Affairs, where he also captained the university's pistol team. From 1996 to 2000, he taught the annual Management of Technology class in Georgetown University's MBA program, and then annually, from 2001-2010, he taught "The Price of U.S. Global Engagement" for Georgetown's Department of Government.

In Washington, Leebaert served as chief economist of CBEMA, now the Information Industry Technology Council, and was appointed a Smithsonian Fellow. He is a founding editor of three enduring periodicals: International Security, the Journal of Policy Analysis and Management, and The International Economy. He was in the United States Marine Corps Reserve, and has been a foreign policy adviser to the presiding bishop of The Episcopal Church. He is a member of the Episcopal Peace Fellowship.

Works 

 The Fifty-Year Wound: How America’s Cold War Victory Shapes Our World Boston : Little, Brown, 2002. , 
 To Dare and to Conquer: Special Operations and the Destiny of Nations from Achilles to Al Qaeda New York : Little, Brown, 2006. , 
Magic and Mayhem: the Delusions of American foreign policy from Korea to Afghanistan, New York : Simon & Schuster, 2010. , 
 Grand Improvisation: America Confronts the British Superpower, 1945–1957, Farrar, Straus & Giroux, 2018. , 
 Unlikely Heroes: Franklin Roosevelt, His Four Lieutenants, and the World They Made,  St. Martin's Press, 2023.  

Edited
European Security : prospects for the 1980s, Lexington, Mass. : Lexington Books, 1981. , 
The Future of the Electronic Marketplace, MIT Press, 1998.
The Future of Software, MIT Press, 1995
Technology 2001: The Future of Computing and Communications, MIT Press, 1991

References

External links 
Postwar Delusions: Why America Keeps Making Mistakes Abroad by Derek Leebaert

Living people
Year of birth missing (living people)